The Newtownabbey Labour Party is a minor political party based in Newtownabbey, Northern Ireland.

The party originated as the Newtownabbey branch of the Northern Ireland Labour Party (NILP).  It left its parent organisation in 1974, in opposition to the NILP's broad support for the Ulster Workers Council strike. Early members included future British Labour Party Member of Parliament Kate Hoey.

The group stood in the 1982 Northern Ireland Assembly election, but were only able to take 560 votes.  However, by 1985, Bob Kidd was able to win a seat on Newtownabbey Borough Council. In 1987, the group helped form Labour '87. Kidd held his seat under this description in 1989. Although he lost in 1993, Mark Langhammer, also standing for the group, was elected onto the Council. He easily held his seat in 1997, then again as an independent in 2001, before standing down at the 2005 elections.

For the 1996 Northern Ireland Peace Forum, the party stood as part of the Labour coalition, which had two members elected. By 2004, it was supporting the Socialist Environmental Alliance. By this point, Langhammer was a prominent member of the Irish Labour Party, and it is unclear whether the Newtownabbey Labour Party continues to undertake independent activity.

References

Labour parties in Northern Ireland
Politics of County Antrim
Political parties established in 1974
1974 establishments in Northern Ireland
Socialist parties in Ireland
Social democratic parties in the United Kingdom